Ricardo Matosinhos (born 6 December 1982) is a Portuguese horn player and pedagogue.

Biography 
Matosinhos was born in 1982. He studied horn with Ivan Kučera at ESPROARTE and with Bohdan Šebestik at ESMAE.
In 2012 he presented his master dissertation entitled "Bibliografia Selecionada e Anotada de Estudos para Trompa Publicados entre 1950 e 2011", presenting the results of this research at the http://www.hornetudes.com website.
He wrote several teaching materials for horn, published by AvA Musical Editions and Phoenix Music Publications. His 15 low horn etudes were recognized with an honorable mention at the 2014 International Horn Society Composition Contest. His music has been played all over the world including music competitions.
He was invited as a guest teacher in several masterclasses and workshops in Portugal at the 24th Interpretation Courses at Praha-Brevnov. Ricardo is currently teaching at the AMCC and at the ESMAE in Oporto Portugal.
In 2004 he created the trompista.com website, a Portuguese horn related web community.

References

External links 

1982 births
Portuguese musicians
Portuguese male musicians
Living people